Change Me is the 12th album of the Taiwanese American R&B artist and composer, Leehom Wang, and was released on July 13, 2007. The album sold more than one million copies within the first month of release.

The track "You Are a Song in My Heart", a duet with Selina of S.H.E, won one of the "Top 10 Songs of the Year" at the 2008 HITO Radio Music Awards. The album was awarded one of the Top 10 Selling Mandarin Albums of the Year at the 2007 IFPI Hong Kong Album Sales Awards, presented by the Hong Kong branch of IFPI.

About the album 
Through this album, Leehom promotes the idea of global awareness in the environment and social awareness as well. In the title track, "Change Me", he sings that single individuals have the power to make a difference in the world and each difference can make the world a better place. The album was printed on recycled paper, contained minimal amount of plastics, and includes a page in the liner notes listing ten things ordinary listeners can do to save the environment. Some album editions also include limited edition Leehom's chopsticks with a small tote bag, encouraging listeners to use these reusable chopsticks instead of wasting the disposable wooden chopsticks found in many restaurants.

Inspired by Ang Lee's Lust, Caution, in which he played the role of Kuang Yu Min, Leehom composed "Falling Leaf Returns to Root". The composer of "Falling Leaf Returns to Root" is listed in his album as Kuang Yu Min instead of Leehom Wang. This album also features a duet with S.H.E's Selina Jen, "You Are the Song in My Heart", that sees Leehom singing in the Taiwanese dialect for the first time.

Track listing
 Intro*
 "Change Myself" ( Gǎibìan Zìjǐ)
 "Falling Leaf Returns to Roots" ( Luòyèguīgēn)
 "Preface of Composed Work" ( Chùangzùo Qíanyán)*
 "Our Song" (Wǒmen de Gē)
 "You're a Song in My Heart" (Nǐ Shì Wǒ Xīnnèi de Yī Shǒugē) (featuring Selina Jen)
 "Where's the Love" (Aì Zaì Nǎlǐ)
 "Cockney Girl"
 "Incomplete Melody" (Bù Wánzhěng de Xúanlǜ)
 "Love's Praise" (Aì de Gǔlì)
 "Long Live Chinese People" (Húarén Wànsùi)
 "Saturday Midnight" (Xīngqīliù de Shēnyè)

(*) track not included in the Mainland version.

Charts

References 

2007 albums
Wang Leehom albums
Sony Music Taiwan albums